Moira is a music and arts venue in the city center of Utrecht, Netherlands.

History 	
The building at Wolvenstraat 10 was built in 1906. From 1939 until 1959, it was the Zegers dance school. The insurance company Moira turned it into a canteen, then after it became derelict it was squatted in 1983. Legalized in 1990, it focuses on early career artists and innovative performances. Moira Foundation offers a stage to early career artists and musicians who have made little or no name in the established circuit. The exhibition space Moira organizes about ten events every year. There is a weekly open mic night.

See also 
 ACU (Utrecht)
 Ubica

References

Dutch culture
Buildings and structures in Utrecht (city)
Music venues in the Netherlands
Infoshops
Legalized squats
Squats in the Netherlands
Social centres in the Netherlands